Mario Monti  (born 19 March 1943) is an Italian economist and academic who served as the Prime Minister of Italy from 2011 to 2013, leading a technocratic government in the wake of the Italian debt crisis.

Monti served as a European Commissioner from 1995 to 2004, with responsibility for the Internal Market, Services, Customs and Taxation from 1995 to 1999 and for Competition from 1999 to 2004. Monti has also been rector and president of Bocconi University in Milan for many years.

On 12 November 2011, in the midst of the European sovereign debt crisis, Monti was invited by President Giorgio Napolitano to form a new technocratic government following the resignation of Silvio Berlusconi. Monti was sworn in as Prime Minister on 16 November 2011, just a week after having been appointed a Lifetime Senator by President Napolitano, and initially became Minister of Economy and Finances as well, giving that portfolio up the following July.

From 16 May 2013 to 17 October 2013, Monti was the president of Civic Choice, a centrist political party in Italy.

Early life
Mario Monti was born in Varese on 19 March 1943. His mother was from Piacenza. Although his father grew up in Varese, he was born in Luján in the Buenos Aires Province, Argentina, where his grandfather Abramo had emigrated to from Italy in the 19th century and built up a soft-drink and beer-production business. Monti's father went back to Argentina during World War II, but later returned to his family home in Varese.

Monti studied at the private Leo XIII High School and attended Bocconi University of Milan, where he obtained a degree in economics in 1965. Later, he won a scholarship to Yale University where he studied under James Tobin, a recipient of the Nobel Prize in Economics.

Academic career
Monti began his academic career at the University of Trento, before moving to teach economics at the University of Turin from 1970 to 1985, and finally to Bocconi University, where he was appointed Rector in 1989, and President in 1994. He also served as President of the SUERF (The European Money and Finance Forum) from 1982 to 1985. His research helped to create the "Klein-Monti model", aimed at describing the behaviour of banks operating under monopoly circumstances.

European Commissioner

Santer Commission
In 1994, Monti was appointed to the Santer Commission, along with Emma Bonino, by Prime Minister Silvio Berlusconi. In his office as a European Commissioner from 1994 to 1999, he was responsible for internal market, financial services and financial integration, customs, and taxation. His work with the Commission earned him the nickname "Super Mario" from his colleagues and from the press.

Prodi Commission
In 1999, Prime Minister Massimo D'Alema confirmed Monti's appointment to the new Prodi Commission and he was given one of the most powerful positions at the Commission, with responsibility for Competition.

As Competition Commissioner, Monti led the investigation into a number of high-profile and controversial mergers, including: Scania AB & Volvo (1999), WorldCom & Sprint (2000), General Electric & Honeywell (2001), Schneider Electric & Legrand (2001) and Carnival Corporation & P&O Ferries (2002). His term in office also saw the European Court of Justice, for the first time, overrule the Commission's decision to block a merger in three separate cases, although two were decided by his predecessor. Monti was also responsible for levying the EU's largest ever fine at the time (€497 million) against Microsoft for abusing its dominant market position in 2004.

Monti was criticised in the media and by competition lawyers for the perceived inflexibility of the merger oversight process and the high number of cases that were being blocked. On 1 November 2002, Monti responding to the European Court of Justice's ruling which reversed his decision to block the merger between Airtours & First Choice Holidays said, "Last week was a tough week for the Commission's merger control policy and of course for me." This ruling in combination with his decision to block the General Electric & Honeywell merger led to criticism in the United States against both the Commission's procedures and accusations that Monti's decisions were politically motivated. Monti, however, was defended by supporters who saw his actions as an important step in the development of competition law in the EU. Dan Rubinfeld, economics professor at the University of California who worked on the US Justice Department's antitrust case against Microsoft, said of Monti, "There has been a lot of talk of politics in this and other cases, but I believe he has been driven entirely by the desire to do the right thing."

On 11 December 2002, Monti proposed a series of reforms to the EU's merger rules and made structural changes within the Commission's Competition department which aimed to improve transparency for companies throughout the merger review process. The reforms were adopted by the EU as Regulation 139/2004 (known as ECMR).

In 2004, Prime Minister Silvio Berlusconi returned to power in Italy and chose not to re-appoint Monti to the Commission when his second term ended.

Barroso Commission
In 2010, Monti was asked by Commission President Manuel Barroso to draft a "Report on the Future of the Single Market" proposing further measures towards the completion of the EU's Single Market. The published report, adopted by the EU on 13 April 2011, proposed 12 reforms to the Single Market and was intended to "give new momentum" to the European economy.

Prime Minister of Italy

Appointment

On 9 November 2011, Monti was appointed a lifetime senator by Italian President Giorgio Napolitano. He was seen as a favourite to replace Silvio Berlusconi to lead a new unity government in Italy in order to implement reforms and austerity measures. On 12 November 2011, following Berlusconi's resignation, Napolitano invited Monti to form a new government. Monti accepted the offer, and held talks with the leaders of the main Italian political parties, declaring that he wanted to form a government that would remain in office until the next scheduled general elections in 2013. On 16 November 2011, Monti was sworn in as Prime Minister of Italy, after unveiling a technocratic cabinet composed entirely of unelected professionals. He also chose to hold the post of Minister of Economy and Finances. On 17 and 18 November 2011, the Italian Senate and Italian Chamber of Deputies both passed motions of confidence supporting Monti's government, with only Lega Nord voting against.

Austerity measures
On 4 December 2011, Monti's government introduced emergency austerity measures intended to stem the worsening economic conditions in Italy and restore market confidence, especially after rising Italian government bond yields began to threaten Italy's financial stability. The austerity package called for increased taxes, pension reform and measures to fight tax evasion. Monti also announced that he would be giving up his own salary as part of the reforms. On 16 December 2011, the Lower House of the Italian Parliament adopted the measures by a vote of 495 to 88. Six days later the Upper House gave final approval to the package by a vote of 257 to 41.

Labour market reforms

On 20 January 2012, Monti's government formally adopted a package of reforms targeting Italy's labour market. The reforms are intended to open certain professions (such as taxi drivers, pharmacists, doctors, lawyers and notaries) to more competition by reforming their licensing systems and abolishing minimum tariffs for their services. Article 18 of Italy's labour code, which requires companies that employ 15 or more workers to re-hire (rather than compensate) any employee found to have been fired without just cause, would also be reformed. The reforms to Article 18 are intended to make it easier for companies to dismiss or lay-off employees, which would hopefully encourage companies to hire more employees on permanent rather than short-term renewable contracts. The proposals have been met by strong opposition from labour unions and public protests. In early January 2012, consultations between the government and labour unions commenced and on 13 February it was reported in the Italian media that a compromise on the proposals was very close and the government was hopeful that reforms could be approved by the Italian parliament in March.

2013 election
On 21 December 2012, Monti announced his resignation as Prime Minister, having made a public promise to step down on 8 December, after the passing of the 2013 Budget. He initially stated that he would only remain in office until an early election could be held. However, on 28 December, he announced that he would seek to remain Prime Minister by contesting the election, as the leader of a centrist coalition, the Civic Choice.

The election was held on 24 February 2013, and Monti's centrist coalition was only able to come fourth, with 10.5% of the vote. Monti remained Prime Minister until a coalition was formed on 28 April led by Enrico Letta.

Political career

Lifetime Senator

On 9 November 2011, Monti was appointed a Lifetime Senator by Italian President Giorgio Napolitano, in accordance with the second paragraph of "Article 59 of the Constitution, which merits national honor distinguished in science and society". He was a member of the Commission for Industry, Commerce and Tourism from 30 November 2011 to 14 March 2013 in the sixteenth legislature. Monti was a member of the independents' mixed parliamentary group until 19 March 2013, when he joined the Civic Choice (SC) parliamentary group, becoming the first lifetime senator aligned with a party group. On 7 May 2013, he became a member of the Commission for Foreign Affairs and Emigration.

President of Civic Choice
On 4 January 2013, Monti launched Civic Choice as an electoral list of the civil society, to realize the implementation of his agenda in a future government. SC was announced as part of the With Monti for Italy (CMI) centrist coalition, alongside Union of the Centre (UdC) and Future and Freedom (FLI). In the 2013 general election, the party obtained 8.3% of the vote, 37 deputies (on own lists) and 15 senators (within CMI). On 12 March 2013, Civic Choice was turned into a political party as Monti took office as acting SC president in the Provisional Committee of the party and appointed senator Andrea Olivero as provisional political coordinator. On 16 May 2013, Mario Monti was unanimously elected president of the Civic Choice.

On 17 October 2013 he resigned and was replaced by his deputy Alberto Bombassei as acting president. Monti cited his disagreement with 12 senators (out of 20), including Mario Mauro, Andrea Olivero, Gabriele Albertini, Pier Ferdinando Casini (UdC leader), Maria Paola Merloni, Luigi Marino and Lucio Romano. Particularly, Monti criticized Mauro's line of unconditioned support to the government and of transforming SC in a larger centre-right political party, open to The People of Freedom.

Other activities
Monti actively participates in several major think tanks. He was the founding chairman of Bruegel, another European think tank, which was formed in 2005.

Monti is a leading member of the exclusive Bilderberg Group. He has also been an international advisor to Goldman Sachs and The Coca-Cola Company.

In 2007, Monti was one of the first supporters of the first European civic forum, États Généraux de l'Europe, initiated by European think tank EuropaNova and European Movement. He was also a member of the French government's Attali Commission from 2007 to 2008, appointed by Nicolas Sarkozy to provide recommendations to enhance economic growth in France.

Monti is a founding member of the Spinelli Group, an organization launched in September 2010 to facilitate integration within the European Union (other members of the steering group include Jacques Delors, Daniel Cohn-Bendit, Guy Verhofstadt, Andrew Duff and Elmar Brok).

In January 2014, Monti became Chairman of the High Level Group on Own Resources, a consultative committee of the European Union aimed at proposing new forms of revenue for the European Union's budget. The final report of the group was adopted in December 2016 and published in January 2017. It argued for new tax sources, such as on carbon and fuel.

In 2019, Monti chaired a search committee which recommended to the European Commission the appointment of Mauro Ferrari as the next President of the European Research Council (ERC). In 2020, he was appointed by the World Health Organization's Regional Office for Europe to chair the Pan-European Commission on Health and Sustainable Development to make recommendations on investments and reforms to improve the resilience of health and social care systems.

Other activities include: 
 Center for Economic and Policy Research (CEPR), Distinguished Fellow (since 2019)
 Centre for European Reform (CER), Member of the Advisory Board
 European Investment Bank (EIB), Member of the Appointment Advisory Committee
 Friends of Europe, Member of the Praesidium  
 Moody's, Member of the Senior European Advisory Council 
 Atlantic Council, Member of the Business and Economics Advisors Group
 Transparency International, Chairman of the European Advisory Board (since 2015)
 Trilateral Commission, European Chairman (-2011)

Personal life
Since 1970, Monti has been married to Elsa Antonioli (born 1944), an Italian Red Cross volunteer, with whom he has two children, Federica and Giovanni.

Known for his reserved character, Monti acknowledges not being especially sociable. He said that his youth was given over to hard study; spare-time activities included cycling and keeping up with world affairs by tuning into foreign short-wave radio stations.

In addition to his native Italian, Monti also speaks English.

Awards and decorations

National honours
:
 Knight Grand Cross of the Order of Merit of the Italian Republic (29 November 2004)
 Commander of the Order of Merit of the Italian Republic (27 December 1992)

Foreign honours
:
 Grand Cordon of the Order of the Rising Sun (3 November 2015)

See also
List of prime ministers of Italy
Monti Cabinet
Monti's Agenda for Italy

References

External links

 Profile of Mario Monti at The Telegraph
 Articles about Monti at The Guardian

|-

|-

|-

|-

|-

|-

|-

|-

1943 births
20th-century Italian politicians
20th-century  Italian economists
21st-century Italian politicians
Academic staff of Bocconi University
Civic Choice politicians
Independent politicians in Italy
Coca-Cola people
Eurofederalism
European Commissioners for Competition
Italian European Commissioners
Italian life senators
Italian people of Argentine descent
Goldman Sachs people
Members of the Steering Committee of the Bilderberg Group
Living people
Politicians from Varese
Prime Ministers of Italy
Finance ministers of Italy
Academic staff of the University of Turin
Yale University alumni
Bruegel (think tank) people
Giornale degli economisti e annali di economia editors